Adarsh Vidya Niketan is a higher secondary school located at Bhimduttnagar, Kanchanpur District, Nepal. Also known as AVN, it is located in Far-western Development Region. It conducts various programs every week, including social awareness programs. Bhoj Raj Pant is the principal of AVN. Seema Joshi is the coordinator.

The school has a campus at Bhimduttnagar known as Adarsh Vidya Niketan. It is a management college.

References

Secondary schools in Nepal
Buildings and structures in Kanchanpur District
1993 establishments in Nepal